The Biggest Loser South Africa is a South African reality television show which first aired from 7 January to 14 April 2008 on e.tv. The show is a spin-off of the American reality television show The Biggest Loser. The South African version features Jasmyn Asvat as the host with trainers Bruce Claasen (Blue team) and Lisa Raleigh (Red team).  The premise of the show is similar to other international versions following the format of "temptation", "reward challenge", "weigh-in" and "elimination". In addition to the 15 regular episodes, there are an additional 10 episodes of The Biggest Loser Extra which focuses on the eliminated contestants.

Sharon Haarhoff was the winner of the first season, losing .

Series guide

Teams
 Member of Bruce's team
 Member of Lisa's team
 Sarah had to withdraw due to an injury in Wk 6.
 Louis won The Biggest Loser Extra, a second-chance game to reenter the competition, which allowed him to return in Wk 10, but was eliminated in Wk 11 due to the challenge.
 The 10th weigh-in happened in Wk 11 with no elimination, and it was never shown.
Game
 Last person eliminated before the finale
Winners
 R250,000 and a R10,000 gift voucher from Truworths. (among the finalists)
 R50,000 (among the eliminated players)
 Week's Biggest Loser (Team or Individuals)

References

South Africa
South African reality television series
2008 South African television seasons
2008 South African television series debuts
2000s South African television series
2008 South African television series endings
South African television series based on American television series